Ultraviolet thermal processing or UVTP is the name given to the process of using ultraviolet light to stabilize dielectric films used to insulate semiconductors.

Description
Semiconductor films need low dielectric constants (k-values) for optimal thermal conductivity, to ensure semiconductor scaling.  Newer dielectric films used to insulate modern chips can be easily damaged, causing them to lose their insulating capacity.  Specialized treatments applied with ultraviolet light improve chip performance.  Tungsten halogen lamps are the sources used for traditional rapid thermal processing.

References

Electronics manufacturing
Packaging (microfabrication)
Semiconductor device fabrication
Semiconductor packages
Semiconductor technology